is a private junior college in Tatsuno, Nagano, Japan. It was originally established as a women's junior college in 1983. In 2000, it became coeducational.

External links
 Official website 

Educational institutions established in 1983
Private universities and colleges in Japan
Universities and colleges in Nagano Prefecture
1983 establishments in Japan
Japanese junior colleges
Tatsuno, Nagano